Salamandridae is a family of salamanders consisting of true salamanders and newts. Salamandrids are distinguished from other salamanders by the lack of rib or costal grooves along the sides of their bodies and by their rough skin. Their skin is very granular because of the number of poison glands. They also lack nasolabial grooves. Most species of Salamandridae have moveable eyelids but lack lacrimal glands.

Nearly all salamandrids produce a potent toxin in their skin, with some species being deadly to many other animal species. With a few exceptions, salamandrids have patterns of bright and contrasting colours, most of these are to warn potential predators of their toxicity. They have four well-developed limbs, with four toes on the fore limbs, and (in most cases) five toes on the hind limbs.

Many species within this family reproduce by method of internal fertilization. Additionally, there are many species-specific courtship rituals that males perform to attract mates. These courtship rituals often employ pheromones to induce mating behavior in females. Pheromones have been discovered to be the driving force behind female mating responses in Alpine newts. These pheromones can induce behavior even when male visual epidemic characters and courtship dances are absent. All species within the genus Lyciasalamandra are viviparous, meaning they give birth to live young, without a tadpole stage. There are some species within the genus Salamandra are known to be viviparous too. Some newts are neotenic, being able to reproduce before they are fully metamorphosed. The females of many species can store sperm for up to 6 months at a time.

Toxicity 

The genus Taricha use the poison tetrodotoxin (TTX) that binds and blocks voltage-gated sodium channels (Nav) in nerves and muscles. This blockage causes the cessation of action potentials, leading to paralysis and death. Tetrodotoxin is the most toxic non-protein substance known. The rough-skinned newt (Taricha granulosa) uses tetrodotoxin and is considered the most poisonous species of newt. There are species and sub-species of Taricha that live in concurrent regions with a garter snake (Thamnophis) that has developed a resistance to the TTX poisoning. Species that inhabit regions with resistant Thamnophis snakes have evolved to increase their concentrations of TTX in an evolutionary arms race of predator versus prey.

Conservation Status (IUCN Redlist)

Phylogeny
Cladograms based on the work of Pyron and Wiens (2011) and modified using Mikko Haaramo

Taxonomy
The genus Salamandrina is the only member of the subfamily Salamandrininae, and the genera Chioglossa, Lyciasalamandra, Mertensiella, and Salamandra are grouped in the subfamily Salamandrinae, with sixteen other genera comprising the subfamily Pleurodelinae. Those with a more thoroughly aquatic lifestyle are referred to as "newts", but this is not a formal taxonomic description.

Family SALAMANDRIDAE

Subfamily Pleurodelinae
Genus Calotriton - two species
Calotriton arnoldi Carranza & Amat, 2005
Calotriton asper (Dugès, 1852)
Genus Cynops (fire belly newts) - ten species
Cynops chenggongensis Kou and Xing, 1983
Cynops cyanurus Liu, Hu, and Yang, 1962
Cynops ensicauda (Hallowell, 1861)
Cynops fudingensis Wu, Wang, Jiang, and Hanken, 2010
Cynops glaucus Yuan, Jiang, Ding, Zhang, and Che, 2013
Cynops orientalis (David, 1873)
Cynops orphicus Risch, 1983
Cynops pyrrhogaster (Boie, 1826)
Cynops wolterstorffi (Boulenger, 1905)
Cynops yunnanensis Yang, 1983
Genus Echinotriton - three species
Echinotriton andersoni (Boulenger, 1892)
Echinotriton chinhaiensis (Chang, 1932)
Echinotriton maxiquadratus Hou, Wu, Yang, Zheng, Yuan, and Li, 2014
Genus Euproctus - two species
Euproctus montanus (Savi, 1838)
Euproctus platycephalus (Gravenhorst, 1829)
Genus Ichthyosaura - one species
Ichthyosaura alpestris (Laurenti, 1768)
Genus Laotriton - one species
Laotriton laoensis (Stuart & Papenfuss, 2002)
Genus Lissotriton - ten species
Lissotriton boscai (Lataste, 1879)
Lissotriton graecus (Wolterstorff, 1906)
Lissotriton helveticus (Razoumovsky, 1789)
Lissotriton italicus (Peracca, 1898)
Lissotriton kosswigi (Freytag, 1955)
Lissotriton lantzi (Wolterstorff, 1914)
Lissotriton maltzani (Boettger, 1879)
Lissotriton montandoni (Boulenger, 1880)
Lissotriton schmidtleri (Raxworthy, 1988)
Lissotriton vulgaris (Linnaeus, 1758)
Genus Neurergus - five species
Neurergus barani Öz, 1994
Neurergus crocatus Cope, 1862
Neurergus derjugini (Nesterov, 1916)
Neurergus kaiseri Schmidt, 1952
Neurergus strauchii (Steindachner, 1887)
Genus Notophthalmus - three species
Notophthalmus meridionalis (Cope, 1880)
Notophthalmus perstriatus (Bishop, 1941)
Notophthalmus viridescens (Rafinesque, 1820)
Genus Ommatotriton - three species
Ommatotriton nesterovi (Litvinchuk, Zuiderwijk, Borkin, and Rosanov, 2005)
Ommatotriton ophryticus (Berthold, 1846)
Ommatotriton vittatus (Gray, 1835)
Genus Pachytriton - ten species
Pachytriton airobranchiatus Li, Yuan, Li, and Wu, 2018
Pachytriton archospotus Shen, Shen, and Mo, 2008
Pachytriton brevipes (Sauvage, 1876)
Pachytriton changi Nishikawa, Matsui, and Jiang, 2012
Pachytriton feii Nishikawa, Jiang, and Matsui, 2011
Pachytriton granulosus Chang, 1933
Pachytriton inexpectatus Nishikawa, Jiang, Matsui, and Mo, 2011
Pachytriton moi Nishikawa, Jiang, and Matsui, 2011
Pachytriton wuguanfui Yuan, Zhang, and Che, 2016
Pachytriton xanthospilos Wu, Wang, and Hanken, 2012
Genus Paramesotriton - fourteen species
Paramesotriton aurantius Yuan, Wu, Zhou, and Che, 2016
Paramesotriton caudopunctatus (Liu and Hu, 1973)
Paramesotriton chinensis (Gray, 1859)
Paramesotriton deloustali (Bourret, 1934)
Paramesotriton fuzhongensis Wen, 1989
Paramesotriton guangxiensis (Huang, Tang, and Tang, 1983)
Paramesotriton hongkongensis (Myers and Leviton, 1962) 
Paramesotriton labiatus (Unterstein, 1930)
Paramesotriton longliensis Li, Tian, Gu, and Xiong, 2008
Paramesotriton maolanensis Gu, Chen, Tian, Li, and Ran, 2012
Paramesotriton qixilingensis Yan, Zhao, Jiang, Hou, He, Murphy, and Che, 2014
Paramesotriton wulingensis Wang, Tian, and Gu, 2013
Paramesotriton yunwuensis Wu, Jiang, and Hanken, 2010
Paramesotriton zhijinensis Li, Tian, and Gu, 2008
Genus Pleurodeles - three species
Pleurodeles nebulosus (Guichenot, 1850)
Pleurodeles poireti (Gervais, 1836)
Pleurodeles waltl Michahelles, 1830
Genus Taricha - four species
Taricha granulosa (Skilton, 1849)
Taricha rivularis (Twitty, 1935)
Taricha sierrae (Twitty, 1942)
Taricha torosa (Rathke, 1833)
Genus Triturus (crested newts) - nine species
Triturus anatolicus Wielstra & Arntzen, 2016
Triturus carnifex (Laurenti, 1768)
Triturus cristatus (Laurenti, 1768)
Triturus dobrogicus (Kiritzescu, 1768)
Triturus ivanbureschi Arntzen & Wielstra, 2013
Triturus karelinii (Strauch, 1870)
Triturus macedonicus (Karaman, 1922)
Triturus marmoratus (Latreille, 1800)
Triturus pygmaeus (Wolterstorff, 1905)
Genus Tylototriton (crocodile newts) - twenty-five species
Tylototriton anguliceps Le, Nguyen, Nishikawa, Nguyen, Pham, Matsui, Bernardes, and Nguyen, 2015
Tylototriton anhuiensis Qian, Sun, Li, Guo, Pan, Kang, Wang, Jiang, Wu, and Zhang, 2017
Tylototriton asperrimus Unterstein, 1930
Tylototriton broadoridgus Shen, Jiang, and Mo, 2012
Tylototriton dabienicus Chen, Wang, and Tao, 2010
Tylototriton hainanensis Fei, Ye, and Yang, 1984
Tylototriton himalayanus Khatiwada, Wang, Ghimire, Vasudevan, Paudel, and Jiang, 2015
Tylototriton kachinorum Zaw, Lay, Pawangkhanant, Gorin, and Poyarkov, 2019
Tylototriton kweichowensis Fang and Chang, 1932
Tylototriton liuyangensis Yang, Jiang, Shen, and Fei, 2014
Tylototriton lizhengchangi Hou, Zhang, Jiang, Li and Lu, 2012
Tylototriton ngarsuensis Grismer, Wood, Quah, Thura, Espinoza, Grismer, Murdoch, and Lin, 2018
Tylototriton notialis Stuart, Phimmachak, Sivongxay, and Robichaud, 2010
Tylototriton panhai Nishikawa, Khonsue, Pomchote, and Matsui, 2013
Tylototriton podichthys Phimmachak, Aowphol, and Stuart, 2015
Tylototriton pseudoverrucosus Hou, Gu, Zhang, Zeng, and Lu, 2012
Tylototriton shanjing Nussbaum, Brodie, and Yang, 1995
Tylototriton shanorum Nishikawa, Matsui, and Rao, 2014
Tylototriton taliangensis Liu, 1950
Tylototriton uyenoi Nishikawa, Khonsue, Pomchote, and Matsui, 2013
Tylototriton verrucosus Anderson, 1871
Tylototriton vietnamensis Böhme, Schöttler, Nguyen, and Köhler, 2005
Tylototriton wenxianensis Fei, Ye, and Yang, 1984
Tylototriton yangi Hou, Zhang, Zhou, Li, and Lu, 2012
Tylototriton ziegleri Nishikawa, Matsui, and Nguyen, 2013
Subfamily Salamandrinae
Genus Chioglossa - one species
Chioglossa lusitanica Bocage, 1864
Genus Lyciasalamandra - seven species
Lyciasalamandra antalyana (Başoğlu and Baran, 1976)
Lyciasalamandra atifi (Başoğlu, 1967)
Lyciasalamandra billae (Franzen and Klewen, 1987)
Lyciasalamandra fazilae (Başoğlu and Atatür, 1975 "1974")
Lyciasalamandra flavimembris (Mutz and Steinfartz, 1995)
Lyciasalamandra helverseni (Pieper, 1963)
Lyciasalamandra luschani (Steindachner, 1891) 
Genus Mertensiella - one species
Mertensiella caucasica (Waga, 1876)
Genus Salamandra (fire salamanders) - seven species
Salamandra algira Bedriaga, 1883
Salamandra atra Laurenti, 1768
Salamandra corsica Savi, 1838
Salamandra infraimmaculata Martens, 1885
Salamandra lanzai Nascetti, Andreone, Capula, and Bullini, 1988
Salamandra longirostris Joger and Steinfartz, 1994
Salamandra salamandra (Linnaeus, 1758)
Subfamily Salamandrininae
Genus Salamandrina- two species
Salamandrina perspicillata (Savi, 1821)
Salamandrina terdigitata (Bonnaterre, 1789)

Fossil record
Salamandrids have a substantial fossil record spanning most of the Cenozoic. The oldest known fossils date from the Thanetian (Paleocene), but these, and most other known fossil salamandrids apparently belong to the crown group. The sole known stem-salamandrid is Phosphotriton sigei, from the Quercy Phosphorites Formation, which apparently dates from the Middle to Late Eocene.

References

External links

 Tree of Life: Salamandridae
Living Under World
Tylototriton.org

 
Salamandroidea
Amphibian families
Taxa named by Georg August Goldfuss